Mowmenabad (also Romanized as Mow’menābād) is a village in Shurjeh Rural District, in the Central District of Sarvestan County, Fars Province, Iran. At the 2006 census, its population was 296, in 69 families.

References 

Populated places in Sarvestan County